Marcelo Balboa (born August 8, 1967) is an American former professional soccer who played as a defender in the 1990s for the United States national team, becoming its captain. He is a member of the National Soccer Hall of Fame.

After retiring from playing, he has worked as a commentator for ESPN and ABC and MLS games on HDNet and Altitude, as well as FIFA World Cup games on Univision. He is the head boys' soccer coach for Monarch High School in Louisville, Colorado

Club career

Youth
Balboa, who is of Argentine descent, was born in Chicago, Illinois, and grew up in Cerritos, California.  Balboa played youth soccer for Fram-Culver, which won the 1986 McGuire Cup (U-19 National Championship).  Balboa's father, Luis Balboa who played professionally in Argentina and with the Chicago Mustangs of the North American Soccer League, coached him.  In 1985, Balboa graduated from Cerritos High School.

Balboa attended Cerritos College, a local two-year community college from 1986 to 1987.  At Cerritos, Balboa was both placekicker on the football team and a two-time 1st Team All-South Coast Conference soccer player.  Cerritos College has retired Balboa's jersey number – #3.  In 1988, Balboa transferred to San Diego State University where he was a 1988 First Team and a 1989 Second Team All American soccer player.

Professional
From 1987 to 1989, Balboa played the collegiate off-seasons on an amateur contract with the professional San Diego Nomads of the Western Soccer League.  He was the 1988 WSA MVP.  In 1990, Balboa began his professional career with the San Francisco Bay Blackhawks of the American Professional Soccer League.  In 1992, he moved to the Colorado Foxes. He played for León in the Mexican League in 1995 and 1996.

In 1996, Balbao signed with Major League Soccer and the Colorado Rapids. Balboa played six seasons for the Rapids, leading as the team's all-time leader in many statistical categories.  Traded to the MetroStars in 2002, he played only five minutes all year, sitting out the rest with injuries, and retiring afterwards.

Balboa ended his MLS career with 24 goals and 23 assists in 152 games. In 2005, Balboa was named to the MLS All-Time Best XI and elected to the National Soccer Hall of Fame on the first ballot along with Nick Folan.  In 2012, he was inducted into the Colorado Hall of Fame.

A goal by Balboa for the Rapids in 2000 against the Columbus Crew was named the MLS Goal of the Year for that season.

International career
Balboa earned his first cap with United States national team on January 10, 1988 against Guatemala. He anchored the American defense in the 1990 and the 1994 FIFA World Cups, in the latter receiving international attention for his near miss with a bicycle kick in the United States' win over Colombia. He was named U.S. Soccer Athlete of the Year in 1992 and 1994. In 1995, he became the first United States player to break the 100-cap barrier. In 1998, he joined Tab Ramos and Eric Wynalda as the first United States players to play in three World Cups. Balboa ended his United States career with 128 caps and 13 goals, and his final appearance came in a friendly against Iran on January 16, 2000.

Post-retirement

Team executive
After the 2004 MLS season, Balboa assumed a front office position with the Rapids.

Broadcaster
Balboa debuted as a sideline reporter during ABC's coverage of the 2003 MLS All-Star Game and MLS Cup. In 2004, he became a regular announcer for ABC and ESPN's television coverage of the United States national team. Most recently, Balboa has paired up with baseball announcer Dave O'Brien as networks' #1 U.S. announcing team for the 2006 FIFA World Cup.

In 2007, Balbao started a soccer radio show, From The Pitch, which airs on Denver station Mile High Sports Radio. Balboa served as an analyst for NBC Sports coverage of Soccer at the 2008 Summer Olympics.  He has been a guest soccer analyst on Telefutura's Contacto Deportivo.

In 2014, he was commentator of the United States team matches for Univision at the World Cup in Brazil.

Coaching
In 2012, Monarch High School hired Balboa to coach the boys' soccer team.

Personal life
Balboa, who is the son of Argentine immigrants, resides in the town of Superior, Colorado.

Career statistics

Scores and results list the United States' goal tally first, score column indicates score after each Balboa goal.

See also
 List of men's footballers with 100 or more international caps

References

External links
 Interview on Role Models from CaptainU
 
 

1967 births
Living people
American people of Argentine descent
People from Cerritos, California
Sportspeople from Los Angeles County, California
Soccer players from California
Soccer players from Chicago
American soccer players
Association football defenders
San Diego State Aztecs men's soccer players
All-American men's college soccer players
Nomads Soccer Club players
San Francisco Bay Blackhawks players
Colorado Foxes players
Club León footballers
Colorado Rapids players
New York Red Bulls players
Western Soccer Alliance players
American Professional Soccer League players
Liga MX players
Major League Soccer players
Major League Soccer All-Stars
United States men's under-20 international soccer players
United States men's international soccer players
1990 FIFA World Cup players
1991 CONCACAF Gold Cup players
1992 King Fahd Cup players
1994 FIFA World Cup players
1995 Copa América players
1996 CONCACAF Gold Cup players
1998 CONCACAF Gold Cup players
1998 FIFA World Cup players
1999 FIFA Confederations Cup players
CONCACAF Gold Cup-winning players
FIFA Century Club
National Soccer Hall of Fame members
American expatriate soccer players
American expatriate sportspeople in Mexico
Expatriate footballers in Mexico
American soccer coaches
Colorado Rapids non-playing staff
Association football commentators
Major League Soccer broadcasters
High school soccer coaches in the United States